McKernan/Belgravia station is an Edmonton Light Rail Transit station in Edmonton, Alberta. It is served by the Capital Line, and is the least used station on the LRT system. It is a ground-level station located on 114 Street at 76 Avenue.

The station, located between the Health Sciences/Jubilee station and the South Campus/Fort Edmonton Park station, provides service to the neighborhoods of Belgravia and McKernan.

History
Originally, the proposed name for the station was the 76 Avenue Station; however both the Belgravia Community League and the McKernan Community League wanted the name to reflect their communities. After much discussion by the McKernan Community League Historian, Ed Stover, City Council voted to change the name to McKernan/Belgravia in October 2006.

The station was officially opened on April 25, 2009, with regular service commencing on  April 26, 2009.

McKernan/Belgravia is the least used station on the entire Edmonton LRT network, with usually under 5,000 riders per day.

The station closed for platform repairs and tile replacement in early May 2020 and reopened in late July 2020.

Station Layout
The station has a 123 metre long centre loading platform that can accommodate two five-car trains at the same time, one on each side of the platform. The platform is six metres wide, narrow by current Edmonton LRT design guidelines.

A pedestrian underpass, included as part of the station design, allows passengers and other pedestrian traffic to easily cross 114 Street and connects the McKernan and Belgravia neighbourhoods.

Around the station
Belgravia
McKernan
McKernan School

References

External links

Edmonton Light Rail Transit stations
Railway stations in Canada opened in 2009
Capital Line